Oliver Smith (February 13, 1918 – January 23, 1994) was an American scenic designer and interior designer.

Biography
Born in Waupun, Wisconsin, Smith attended Penn State, after which he moved to New York City and began to form friendships that blossomed into working relationships with such talents as Leonard Bernstein, Jerome Robbins, Carson McCullers, and Agnes de Mille. In his early 20s, he lived at February House in Brooklyn with a coterie of famous people centered on George Davis and W. H. Auden. He tended the furnace, washed the dishes, and soothed the tempers of both residents and visitors. His career was launched with his designs for Léonide Massine's ballet Saratoga in 1941 and de Mille's Rodeo in 1942.

Smith designed dozens of Broadway musicals, films (Guys and Dolls, The Band Wagon, Oklahoma!, Porgy and Bess), and operas (La Traviata). His association with the American Ballet Theatre began in 1944, when he collaborated with Robbins and Bernstein on Fancy Free, which served as the inspiration for On the Town. The following year, he became co-director of ABT with Lucia Chase, a position he held until 1980. He designed the sets for ABT's complete 1967 production of Swan Lake, the first full-length version mounted by an American company.

Smith also trained young designers for many years, serving on the faculty of New York University's Tisch School of the Arts, where he taught master classes in scenic design.

Throughout his career, Smith was nominated for twenty-five Tony Awards, often multiple times in the same year, and won ten. He was nominated for the Academy Award for Best Art Direction for his work on Guys and Dolls.

Smith was inducted into the American Theater Hall of Fame in 1981. In 2011, Smith was inducted into the National Museum of Dance's Mr. & Mrs. Cornelius Vanderbilt Whitney Hall of Fame.

Smith redesigned the ballroom of the Waldorf-Astoria Hotel (New York City Landmark and Interior Landmark), New York, in the early 1960s.

Smith died of emphysema in Brooklyn, New York.

Notable productions

 1944 On the Town
 1947 High Button Shoes
 1949 Gentlemen Prefer Blondes
 1951 Paint Your Wagon
 1953 Carnival in Flanders
 1954 On Your Toes (revival)
 1955 Will Success Spoil Rock Hunter?
 1956 My Fair Lady
 1956 Auntie Mame
 1956 Candide
 1957 West Side Story
 1957 Brigadoon (revival)
 1957 Carousel (revival)
 1958 Flower Drum Song
 1959 The Sound of Music
 1959 Take Me Along
 1959 Goodbye Charlie
 1960 Camelot
 1960 The Unsinkable Molly Brown
 1960 Becket
 1961 The Night of the Iguana
 1963 Barefoot in the Park
 1964 Hello, Dolly!
 1964 Ben Franklin in Paris
 1964 Luv
 1965 Kelly
 1965 Baker Street
 1965 The Odd Couple
 1965 On a Clear Day You Can See Forever
 1965 Cactus Flower
 1966 Breakfast at Tiffany's
 1966 Show Boat (revival)
 1967 I Do! I Do!
 1967 Illya Darling
 1968 Plaza Suite
 1969 Dear World
 1969 The Last of the Red Hot Lovers
 1970 Lovely Ladies, Kind Gentlemen
 1971 The Most Important Man
 1973 The Women (revival)
 1978 First Monday in October
 1979 Carmelina
 1982 84 Charing Cross Road

References

External links

 
 W.H. Crain Costume and Scene Design Collection at the Harry Ransom Center

1918 births
1994 deaths
American Ballet Theatre
American scenic designers
Broadway set designers
Ballet designers
Pennsylvania State University alumni
People from Waupun, Wisconsin
Special Tony Award recipients
Tony Award winners
People from Brooklyn Heights